Rock Branch (also called Rock Creek) is a stream in the U.S. states of Missouri and Oklahoma. It is a tributary of Fivemile Creek.

The stream headwaters arise at  approximately five miles southwest of Joplin and one mile south of I-44. The stream flows to the southwest roughly parallel to I-44.

Rock Branch was so named on account of the rocky character of its creek bed.

See also
List of rivers of Missouri
List of rivers of Oklahoma

References

Rivers of Newton County, Missouri
Rivers of Ottawa County, Oklahoma
Rivers of Missouri
Rivers of Oklahoma